Lilla Sipos (born 14 July 1992) is a Hungarian footballer, who plays as a striker for SKN St. Pölten in the ÖFB-Frauenliga.

She is a member of the Hungarian national team.

Club career
Sipos played for FC Südburgenland of the Austrian ÖFB-Frauenliga and for Viktória FC-Szombathely of the Hungarian 1st Division.

In July 2014 Sipos signed for AGSM Verona in the Italian Serie A.

In 2015, she returned to the Austrian ÖFB-Frauenliga signing with St. Pölten-Spratzern.

References

External links

 Profile at FSK St. Pölten-Spratzern 
 

1992 births
Living people
Hungarian women's footballers
Ferencvárosi TC (women) footballers
Viktória FC-Szombathely players
Serie A (women's football) players
A.S.D. AGSM Verona F.C. players
Expatriate women's footballers in Italy
Hungarian expatriate sportspeople in Italy
Hungarian expatriate sportspeople in Austria
People from Mosonmagyaróvár
Women's association football forwards
Expatriate women's footballers in Austria
FSK St. Pölten-Spratzern players
Hungary women's international footballers
ÖFB-Frauenliga players
FC Südburgenland players
Sportspeople from Győr-Moson-Sopron County
Hungarian expatriate footballers